Suvi Minkkinen (born 8 December 1994) is a Finnish biathlete. She made her World Cup debut in 2017 in Östersund, Sweden. At club level she represents Joutsan Pommi. In addition to biathlon she has also competed in cross-country skiing at national level.

She participated in the 2018 Winter Olympics.

References

1994 births
Living people
People from Joutsa
Finnish female biathletes
Olympic biathletes of Finland
Biathletes at the 2018 Winter Olympics
Biathletes at the 2022 Winter Olympics
Competitors at the 2015 Winter Universiade
Sportspeople from Central Finland